Tolon is one of the constituencies represented in the Parliament of Ghana. It elects one Member of Parliament (MP) by the first past the post system of election. It is located in the Northern Region of Ghana. The current member of Parliament for the constituency is Hon. Wahab Wumbei Suhuyini. He was elected on the ticket of the New Patriotic Party, NPP

Members of Parliament

See also
List of Ghana Parliament constituencies

References 

Parliamentary constituencies in the Northern Region (Ghana)
Dagbon